Chucho the Mended (Spanish: Chucho el remendado) is a 1952 Mexican comedy film directed by Gilberto Martínez Solares and starring Germán Valdés, Alicia Caro and Perla Aguiar.

Partial cast
 Germán Valdés as Tin Tan / Valentín Gaytán  
 Alicia Caro as Magdalena  
 Perla Aguiar as Margot  
 Marcelo Chávez as Marcelo  
 Juan García as Detective 
 Tito Novaro as Marcelito  
 Magda Donato as Sirenia  
 Queta Lavat as Beatriz  
 Lucrecia Muñoz as Lupe, sirvienta  
 Pedro de Aguillón as Horacio  
 Bertha Lehar as Discipula de tango  
 Georgina González as Amiga de Beatriz  
 Raquel Muñoz as Secretaria  
 Eduardo Alcaraz as Amante de Margot  
 Enrique Zambrano as Complice de Tin  
 Manuel Trejo Morales as Invitado a reunión  
 Yolanda Montes as Bailarina

References

Bibliography 
 Sonny Richard Ernest Espinoza. Chicanismo in Film and Popular Culture: Betwixt and Between Cinematic and Institutional Borders. 2001.

External links 
 

1952 films
1952 comedy films
Mexican comedy films
1950s Spanish-language films
Films directed by Gilberto Martínez Solares
Mexican black-and-white films
1950s Mexican films